The 1910–11 British Home Championship was an international football tournament played between the British Home Nations. After a close competition between England, Scotland and Wales, England won by a single point. Scotland and Wales followed with another point between them above Ireland who failed to gain a single point and only scored two goals.

Wales and Ireland began the tournament with the Welsh winning a close match in Belfast. England played Ireland in the second game with the same scoreline, leaving England and Wales equal at the head of the table. Wales and Scotland drew a hard-fought game before Scotland finished Ireland's tournament with a 2–0 win. England and Wales played a match in London in which a Welsh win would have given them the title but the English side was too strong and ran out 3–0. In the final game between England and Scotland, a win for either side would gain them the championship but England would also win with a draw, a result they achieved at home in Liverpool.

Table

Results

Winning squad

References

1911 in British sport
1911
1910–11 in Scottish football
1910–11 in English football
Brit
Brit

it:Torneo Interbritannico 1910